The Bahamas are a country within the Lucayan Archipelago of the West Indies in the Caribbean.

Bahama or Bahamas may also refer to:
 Bahama, North Carolina, an unincorporated community in northern Durham County
 Bahamas (musician) or Afie Jurvanen (born 1981), Canadian musician
 "Bahama" (song), a 2008 single by Ingó og Veðurguðirnir 
 , an offshore patrol vessel operated by the Royal Bahamas Defence Force 
 HMS Bahamas, a frigate that served in the British Royal Navy from 1943 to 1946
 LMS Jubilee Class 5596 Bahamas, a British steam locomotive
 Bahamas (magazine), a political magazine associated with the Anti-Germans

See also
Bahama Banks, the submerged carbonate platforms that make up much of the Bahama Archipelago
Bahama Breeze, an American restaurant chain
 "I'm Born Again/Bahama Mama", a double-A-side single by Boney M.
Bahama oriole (Icterus northropi), a species of bird in the family Icteridae endemic to the Bahamas
Bahamas Stakes, a horse race run annually in Hialeah, Florida
Bahamasair, an airline based in Nassau, Bahamas
Grand Bahama, the northernmost of the islands of the Bahamas
Tommy Bahama, a Seattle-based brand